Arunta is a genus of cicada in the thophini tribe of the Cicadinae subfamily and is allied to the genus Thopha. Two species have been described, Arunta perulata and A. interclusa. These are the only Australian cicada species that have adapted to living in mangroves.

References

Thophini
Insects of Australia
Cicadidae genera